Quaintrelle is a restaurant in Portland, Oregon.

Description and history
Quaintrelle is a New American restaurant on Clinton Street in southeast Portland's Hosford-Abernethy neighborhood. Previously, the business operated on Mississippi Avenue in North Portland, relocating in 2021. Ryley Eckersley serves as chef. The restaurant's seating capacity is approximately 65 (20 indoors and 45 outdoors). Andi Prewitt has described Quaintrelle as a "whimsical fine-dining establishment".

See also

 List of New American restaurants

References

External links
 
 
 Quaintrelle at Zomato

Hosford-Abernethy, Portland, Oregon
New American restaurants in Portland, Oregon